Dáinn may refer to:

 Dáinn (Norse dwarf), dwarf in Norse mythology
 one of the four stags of Yggdrasill, in Norse mythology

See also
Dáin (disambiguation)